HMS Porpoise was an  torpedo cruiser of the Royal Navy, built by J. & G. Thompson at Glasgow and launched on 7 May 1886.

Commenced service on the Australia Station in December 1897. She left the Australia Station and was paid off at Portsmouth 20 May 1901.
She was sold at Bombay on 10 February 1905.

Citations

References
Bastock, John (1988), Ships on the Australia Station, Child & Associates Publishing Pty Ltd; Frenchs Forest, Australia. 

 

1886 ships
Ships built on the River Clyde
Archer-class cruisers
Victorian-era naval ships of the United Kingdom